Chuvan (Russian: Чуванский язык) is an extinct Yukaghir language of Siberia, part of a dialect continuum with the two surviving languages. It was most likely last spoken in the 18th century. Chuvan was widespread in the lower region of the Anadyr River (near Chuvanskoye), spoken by Chuvans. The translations of 22 sentences, recorded in 1781 by I. Benzig, and 210 words written by Fyodor Matyushkin have been preserved.

References 

Yukaghir languages
Extinct languages of Asia
Languages extinct in the 18th century